Konstantinos "Kostas" Tsiklitiras  (30 October 1888 – 10 February 1913) was a Greek athlete and Olympic champion.

Born in Pylos, he moved to Athens in 1905 to study commerce. Tsiklitiras soon took up sports and joined Panellinios GS. He practised football (for Panathinaikos after Panellinios suspended football activities) and water polo, but is best remembered for winning four Olympic medals in standing long jump and standing high jump in the 1908 and 1912 Summer Olympics. He was Greek champion 19 times.

His career stopped in 1913 when he volunteered to fight in the Balkan Wars. Although he could avoid conscription, he insisted on fighting for his country and fought at the Battle of Bizani. He contracted meningitis and died in Athens at the age of 24.  His family home still exists in Pylos and holds a museum of his athletic achievements.  There is a marble statue in front.

References

1888 births
1913 deaths
Deaths from meningitis
Neurological disease deaths in Greece
Infectious disease deaths in Greece
Panathinaikos F.C. players
Greek male high jumpers
Athletes (track and field) at the 1908 Summer Olympics
Athletes (track and field) at the 1912 Summer Olympics
Olympic athletes of Greece
Olympic gold medalists for Greece
Olympic silver medalists for Greece
Olympic bronze medalists for Greece
Greek footballers
Association football goalkeepers
Medalists at the 1912 Summer Olympics
Medalists at the 1908 Summer Olympics
Olympic gold medalists in athletics (track and field)
Olympic silver medalists in athletics (track and field)
Olympic bronze medalists in athletics (track and field)
Standing high jump
Greek people of the Balkan Wars
People from Messenia
Greek military personnel killed in action
Sportspeople from the Peloponnese